, commonly referred to by its German acronym, ANRW, or in English as Rise and Decline of the Roman World, is an extensive collection of books dealing with the history and culture of ancient Rome. Akin to a journal and published in various series, each number of the ANRW comprises scholarly essays contributed by individual authors. The essays are in various modern European languages, but are primarily written in German or English. 

The series is currently published in its second series (Part 2), the  series (that is, relating to the period of the Roman Principate).

History of the work
The series began in 1972, intended as a Festschrift to commemorate the seventy-fifth birthday of Joseph Vogt, a German classicist and historian. Since then, it has grown with time beyond its original remit, and is now more of an encyclopedia, or a serial compendium.  The series seeks to treat aspects of the Roman world, as well as their continuation and reception in the Middle Ages and into modernity, providing a guide to current research.

Structure
Individual volumes of the ANRW are written like handbooks. More than one thousand scholars have contributed to the series.

Part 1, in four volumes, covered topics of the period from the founding of Rome to the end of the Republic. Part 2 (published since 1974) is concerned with the imperial period. Part 3, on late antiquity, is in planning. A unified index ("Register") will eventually complete the work.

Each Part is published in multiple volumes, across six systematic sections:
1. Political History; 
2. Law; 
3. Religion;
4. Language and Literature;
5. Philosophy and the Sciences; and
6. The Arts.

Published volumes
The publication history is complex, with multiple sections published concurrently in Part 2. A list of the published volumes is available through the project's website at the Institute for Classical Studies at Boston University.

References

External links
 De Gruyter web page on ANRW

American book series
Book series introduced in 1972
History books about ancient Rome
Series of history books
De Gruyter books